Mashalla Ahmad ogly Ahmadov (born 2 June 1959) is a retired Soviet Azerbaijani professional football player.

Career
Ahmadov played professional football in the Soviet leagues with Progress Kirovabad, Araz Nakhchivan and Neftchi Baku. He was named one of the three best attacking footballers in the Soviet Union during 1986. He scored 63 goals in 254 Soviet league matches during a career with Neftchi that spanned from 1978 to 1988

Honours
 USSR Federation Cup finalist: 1988.

References

External links
 Profile at Footballfacts.ru

1959 births
Living people
Soviet footballers
Azerbaijani footballers
Soviet Top League players
Soviet Azerbaijani people
Sportspeople from Ganja, Azerbaijan
Association football forwards
Neftçi PFK players
Kapaz PFK players
Araz-Naxçıvan PFK players